Stephen L. Bettinger (April 28, 1924 – December 4, 2010) was a United States Air Force flying ace during the Korean War, credited with shooting down five enemy aircraft.

Bettinger also claimed 1 kill in World War II. He was the final American ace of the Korean War with his final victory claimed on July 20, 1953. He was subsequently shot down and taken prisoner.

See also
List of Korean War flying aces

References

Sources

1924 births
2010 deaths
American Korean War flying aces
American prisoners of war in the Korean War
Recipients of the Croix de Guerre 1939–1945 (France)
Recipients of the Distinguished Flying Cross (United States)
Recipients of the Legion of Merit
Recipients of the Silver Star
Shot-down aviators
United States Air Force officers
United States Army Air Forces pilots of World War II